Rudolf Alfred Höger (12 February 1877 – 7 November 1930) was an Austrian painter of genre art and war art.

Biography
Höger was born in Proßnitz, Moravia. Little is known about his life. During this time, he created many works which are now in the collection of the Heeresgeschichtliches Museum, mostly oil paintings on the Eastern Front and the Balkan Front. He died in Vienna.

Paintings

Höger painted genre art with nostalgic topics, such as Das Hofkonzert (The concert at court), a rococo scene, a late nineteenth-century or early twentieth-century painting of listening to chamber music in the eighteenth century. The artist based its details on possibly older paintings  and not a work from direct experience of the period in which the events took place. Also other pictures by his hand represent a time era that already had passed, like Fröhliche Sangesrunde mit einer Donaulandschaft (Happy round of singers with a landscape on the Danube), a scene that did not originate in the period being depicted, but  some years before, a denial of the artist's own time—a wish to escape from it by retreating into fantasy. Other paintings depict historical scenes, or everyday life scenes from a time not actually in the artist's experience, like Hausmusik (Music at home), Der Vorleser (The recitator), Picknick in Dürnstein, Fröhliche Gesellschaft in den Wachauer Weinbergen (Happy gathering in the vinyards of the Wachau) and Im Maien (In May). He also  painted contemporary scenes at the turn of the 19/20th century; such as Beim Heurigen in Grinzing (At the Heuriger in Grinzing), Markttag (A day at the market), Gaudeamus Igitur and Obstmarkt in Venedig (Fruit market in Venice). Rudolf Alfred Höger painted landscapes and also chose biblical topics such as Susanne und die beiden Alten (Susanna and the two elders).

Selected works

References

External links 

 Rudolf Alfred Höger ak-ansichtskarten.de
 Artists H - Höger, Rudolf Alfred : 31 Postcard ak-ansichtskarten.de
 Rudolf Alfred Höger Artnet
 Rudolf Alfred Höger Christies
 Rudolf Alfred Höger invaluable.com

19th-century Austrian painters
19th-century Austrian male artists
Austrian male painters
20th-century Austrian painters
1877 births
1930 deaths
People from Prostějov
20th-century Austrian male artists